Trilliaceae was a family of flowering plants first named in 1846; however, most taxonomists now consider the genera formerly assigned to it to belong to the family Liliaceae. The APG IV system, of 2016 (unchanged from the APG system, of 1998), does not recognize such a family either and assigns the plants involved to family Melanthiaceae, tribe Parideae.

Nevertheless, some taxonomists still recognize a separate family Trilliaceae. The most important genus in North America is Trillium, and the taxonomy of that genus has always been controversial.

A recent treatment (Farmer and Schilling 2002) stated that the family Trilliaceae, which exhibits an arcto-tertiary distribution, comprises six genera. Three of these exhibit a wide distribution: 
 Paris from Iceland to Japan,
 Daiswa from eastern Asia, and
 Trillium from North America and eastern Asia
Three are monotypic, endemic genera: 
 Trillidium govanianum, with a tepaloid inflorescence, from the Himalayan Mountains;
 Kinugasa japonica, with petaloid sepals, from Japan; and
 Pseudotrillium rivale, newly segregated, with spotted petals, from the Siskiyou Mountains of California and Oregon.

Within Melanthiaceae, these are consolidated into three genera;
Parideae
 Paris L. (including Daiswa and Kinugasa)
 Pseudotrillium S.B.Farmer
 Trillium L. (including Trillidium)

External links 
 Susan Farmer's web pages on Trilliaceae and the genus Trillium
 Farmer & Schilling 2002 -- article in Systematic Botany on Trilliaceae
 Trilliaceae in L. Watson and M.J. Dallwitz (1992 onwards). The families of flowering plants: descriptions, illustrations, identification, information retrieval. Version: 3 May 2006. http://delta-intkey.com.
 links at CSDL, Texas
 history and placement of taxa in Trilliaceae
 morphological characters of genera within Melanthiaceae sensu APG II

Historically recognized angiosperm families